Bulbophyllum amphorimorphum is a species of orchid in the genus Bulbophyllum.

References

amphorimorphum
Taxa named by Joseph Marie Henry Alfred Perrier de la Bâthie